Valukas may refer to:

Anton R. Valukas, American lawyer
Report of Anton R. Valukas
Valuka Iswar, avatar of Shiva